Luna e l'altra is a 1996 Italian fantasy film directed, written and starred by Maurizio Nichetti.

For this film Iaia Forte was awarded with a Silver Ribbon for Best Actress.    Maurizio Nichetti also won a Silver Ribbon for Best Director and was awarded best actor at the Malaga International Fantastic Film Festival.

The film was also nominated for a Golden Globe Award for Best Foreign Language Film, and won the Corbeau D'Or at the Brussels International Fantastic Film Festival.

Cast 
Iaia Forte: Luna di Capua/Ombra
Maurizio Nichetti: Angelo Franchini
Aurelio Fierro: Luna's father
Luigi Maria Burruano: The director
Ivano Marescotti: Caimi
Eva Robin's
Eraldo Turra

See also       
 List of Italian films of 1996

References

External links

1996 films
Italian fantasy comedy films
Films set in Milan
Films directed by Maurizio Nichetti
Films scored by Carlo Siliotto
1990s fantasy comedy films
1990s Italian films